Warren Rock (born 17 March 1942) is an Australian sailor. He competed in the Tornado event at the 1976 Summer Olympics.

References

External links
 

1942 births
Living people
Australian male sailors (sport)
Olympic sailors of Australia
Sailors at the 1976 Summer Olympics – Tornado
Place of birth missing (living people)